De Lorimier Avenue (officially in ) is a major north–south avenue located in Montreal, Quebec, Canada. 
   
It's named after François-Marie-Thomas Chevalier de Lorimier, a leader in the Lower Canada Rebellion, who was executed in the nearby prison.

History 
De Lorimier Avenue was originally named Colborne Avenue, after general John Colborne, who fought against the patriots in the Lower Canada Rebellion. It was renamed to De Lorimier on 27 June 1883.

Geography 
De Lorimier runs from Rue Notre-Dame, near the base of the Jacques Cartier Bridge, to slightly past Crémazie Boulevard in the north of the island.

It traverses the boroughs of Ville-Marie, Le Plateau-Mont-Royal, Rosemont–La Petite-Patrie and Villeray–Saint-Michel–Parc-Extension.

The historic Prison du Pied-du-Courant is located on De Lorimier, by the St. Lawrence River.

References

Streets in Montreal
Centre-Sud
Le Plateau-Mont-Royal
Rosemont–La Petite-Patrie
Villeray–Saint-Michel–Parc-Extension